Waffenfarbe(n) or Egalisierungsfarbe(n) are colors that communicate the rank and arm of service for members of the police force or the Federal Army of the Republic of Austria (de: Bundesheer der Republik Österreich) . They are also referred to as Kragenspiegel (English: collar patches or gorget patches).

History 
In 1920/21, the Austrian Federal Army of the First Republic adopted German Reichswehr uniforms along with their Waffenfarben, albeit with two  notable exceptions: the Austrian infantry adopted grass-green, and the Austrian hunter troops adopted yellow-green (German colors were white for infantry and hunter-green for hunter troops). A new uniform was introduced in 1933 modeled on those worn by the Austro-Hungarian Land forces from 1867–1914. The so-called k.u.k. "Adjustierungsvorschrift" (English: service dress instruction) contains color pattern tables from the year 1912 and regulated the Egalisierungsfarben to be worn.

Austrian Federal Army Waffenfarben

Beret Colors
Austrian Bundesheer often wear berets. Normally, it will be worn to the dress uniform or on special occasions to the field suit. Exempted are only members of the Air Force and the Gebirgsjäger (en: mountain infantry) with an own headgear. The color of the particular beret corresponds to the appropriate branch of service and/or the particular unit or formation. The color of the Bundesadler (federal eagle) and the eagle double-wing on berets is as follows:
Metallic gray - recruits and charges (OR-1 to OR-4)
Silver - NCOs (OR-5 to OR-9)
Gold - officers (OR-1 to OF-5)
Gold on red background - general officers (OF-6 to OF-9)

Federal police 
The Bundespolizei uses corps colors on the rank insignia and Tellerkappe (English: peaked cap).
 Most police wear Krapprot (madder red)
 Higher service (police legal advisor and public health official) wear Bordeauxviolett (Bordeaux red)

K.u.k. Egalisationfarben 

The Adjustierungsvorschrift (English: service dress instruction) contains the color pattern tables from the year 1912.
The name Egalisierung  consists of uniform color at the one hand, and corps color, Waffenfarbe or badge color at the other hand. The system was extremely complicated and was called by slang Farbkastel (English: paintbox). Ultimately, in the k.u.k. common army it was very difficult to distinguish the 102 infantry regiments from Hussars, Lancers or Dragoons, as well as services, service branches, special services, appointments, and so on.

See also

References

 Glossary of German military terms
 Adolf Schlicht, John R. Angolia: Die deutsche Wehrmacht, Uniformierung und Ausrüstung 1933-1945Vol. 1: Das Heer, Motorbuch Verlag, Stuttgart 1992Vol. 3: Die Luftwaffe, Motorbuch Verlag, Stuttgart 1999

Sources 
 Schriften des Heeresgeschichtlifhen Museums in Wien Das k.u.k. Heer im Jahre 1895 Edition Leopold Stocker Graz 1997 
Rest,Ortner,Illming Des Kaisers Rock im 1. Weltkrieg Edition Militaria Vienna 2002 

Military insignia
Austro-Hungarian Army
Military ranks of Austria
Military of Austria-Hungary

de:Waffenfarbe (Österreich)